Mylothra turana is a moth in the family Autostichidae. It was described by Aristide Caradja in 1920. It is found in Uzbekistan.

References

Moths described in 1920
Mylothra